The fourth government of Francisco Franco was formed on 19 July 1951.

Franco's fourth cabinet was made up of members from the different factions or "families" within the National Movement: mainly the FET y de las JONS party—the only legal political party during the Francoist regime—the military, the National Catholic Association of Propagandists (ACNP) and a number of aligned-nonpartisan figures from the civil service. The new government saw the establishment of the Ministry of Information and Tourism.

Council of Ministers
The Council of Ministers was structured into the office for the prime minister and 16 ministries.

Departmental structure
Franco's fourth government was organised into several superior and governing units, whose number, powers and hierarchical structure varied depending on the ministerial department.

Unit/body rank
() Undersecretary
() Director-general
() Military & intelligence agency

Notes

References

Bibliography

External links
Governments. Dictatorship of Franco (18.07.1936 / 20.11.1975). CCHS–CSIC (in Spanish).
Governments of Franco. Dictatorship Chronology (1939–1975). Fuenterrebollo Portal (in Spanish).
The governments of the Civil War and Franco's dictatorship (1936–1975). Lluís Belenes i Rodríguez History Page (in Spanish).
Biographies. Royal Academy of History (in Spanish).

1951 establishments in Spain
1957 disestablishments in Spain
Cabinets established in 1951
Cabinets disestablished in 1957
Council of Ministers (Spain)